The following is an alphabetical list of articles related to the United States Commonwealth of Massachusetts.

0–9 
 
.ma.us – Internet second-level domain for the Commonwealth of Massachusetts
6th State to ratify the Constitution of the United States of America

A
Adjacent states:

Agriculture in Massachusetts
Airports in Massachusetts
Amusement parks in Massachusetts
Aquaria in Massachusetts
commons:Category:Aquaria in Massachusetts
Arboreta in Massachusetts
commons:Category:Arboreta in Massachusetts
Archaeology of Massachusetts
:Category:Archaeological sites in Massachusetts
commons:Category:Archaeological sites in Massachusetts
Architecture of Massachusetts
Area codes in Massachusetts
Art museums and galleries in Massachusetts
commons:Category:Art museums and galleries in Massachusetts
Astronomical observatories in Massachusetts
commons:Category:Astronomical observatories in Massachusetts
Attorney General of the Commonwealth of Massachusetts

B
Beaches of Massachusetts
commons:Category:Beaches of Massachusetts
Boston, Massachusetts, capital of the Colony of Massachusetts Bay 1630–1686, capital of the Dominion of New-England in America 1686–1689, capital of the Colony of Massachusetts Bay 1689–1691, capital of the Province of Massachusetts Bay 1691–1776, capital of the State of Massachusetts Bay 1776–1780, capital of the Commonwealth of Massachusetts since 1780
Boston-Cambridge-Quincy, MA-NH Metropolitan Statistical Area
Boston-Worcester-Manchester, MA-RI-NH Combined Statistical Area
Botanical gardens in Massachusetts
commons:Category:Botanical gardens in Massachusetts
Buildings and structures in Massachusetts
commons:Category:Buildings and structures in Massachusetts

C

Capital of the Commonwealth of Massachusetts
Capitol of the Commonwealth of Massachusetts
commons:Category:Massachusetts State Capitol
Caves of Massachusetts
commons:Category:Caves of Massachusetts
Census statistical areas of Massachusetts
Cities in Massachusetts
commons:Category:Cities in Massachusetts
Climate of Massachusetts
Climate change in Massachusetts
Colleges and universities in Massachusetts
commons:Category:Universities and colleges in Massachusetts
Colony of Massachusetts Bay, 1628–1686 and 1689–1692
Commonwealth of Massachusetts  website
Constitution of the Commonwealth of Massachusetts
Government of the Commonwealth of Massachusetts
:Category:Government of Massachusetts
commons:Category:Government of Massachusetts
Executive branch of the government of the Commonwealth of Massachusetts
Governor of the Commonwealth of Massachusetts
Legislative branch of the government of the Commonwealth of Massachusetts
General Court of the Commonwealth of Massachusetts
Senate of the Commonwealth of Massachusetts
House of Representatives of the Commonwealth of Massachusetts
Judicial branch of the government of the Commonwealth of Massachusetts
Supreme Court of the Commonwealth of Massachusetts
Communications in Massachusetts
commons:Category:Communications in Massachusetts
Companies in Massachusetts

Congressional districts of Massachusetts
Constitution of the Commonwealth of Massachusetts
Convention centers in Massachusetts
commons:Category:Convention centers in Massachusetts
Counties of the Commonwealth of Massachusetts
County seats in Massachusetts
commons:Category:Counties in Massachusetts
Crime in Massachusetts
Culture of Massachusetts
commons:Category:Massachusetts culture

D
Demographics of Massachusetts
Dominion of New-England in America, 1686–1689

E
Economy of Massachusetts
:Category:Economy of Massachusetts
commons:Category:Economy of Massachusetts
Education in Massachusetts
:Category:Education in Massachusetts
commons:Category:Education in Massachusetts
Elections in the State of Massachusetts
:Category:Massachusetts elections
commons:Category:Massachusetts elections
Environment of Massachusetts
commons:Category:Environment of Massachusetts

F

Festivals in Massachusetts
commons:Category:Festivals in Massachusetts
Flag of the Commonwealth of Massachusetts
Forts in Massachusetts
:Category:Forts in Massachusetts
commons:Category:Forts in Massachusetts

G

Gambling in Massachusetts
Geography of Massachusetts
:Category:Geography of Massachusetts
commons:Category:Geography of Massachusetts
Geology of Massachusetts
commons:Category:Geology of Massachusetts
Ghost towns in Massachusetts
:Category:Ghost towns in Massachusetts
commons:Category:Ghost towns in Massachusetts
Golf clubs and courses in Massachusetts
Government of the Commonwealth of Massachusetts  website
:Category:Government of Massachusetts
commons:Category:Government of Massachusetts
Governor of the Commonwealth of Massachusetts
List of governors of Massachusetts
Great Seal of the Commonwealth of Massachusetts
Greater Boston

H
Heritage railroads in Massachusetts
commons:Category:Heritage railroads in Massachusetts
High schools of Massachusetts
Higher education in Massachusetts
Highway routes in Massachusetts
Hiking trails in Massachusetts
commons:Category:Hiking trails in Massachusetts
History of Massachusetts
Historical outline of Massachusetts
:Category:History of Massachusetts
commons:Category:History of Massachusetts
Hospitals in Massachusetts
House of Representatives of the Commonwealth of Massachusetts

I
Images of Massachusetts
commons:Category:Massachusetts
International Institute of New England
Islands of Massachusetts

L
Lakes of Massachusetts
commons:Category:Lakes of Massachusetts
Landmarks in Massachusetts
commons:Category:Landmarks in Massachusetts
Laws of the Commonwealth of Massachusetts
Lieutenant Governor of the Commonwealth of Massachusetts
Lists related to the Commonwealth of Massachusetts:
List of airports in Massachusetts
List of census statistical areas in Massachusetts
List of cities in Massachusetts
List of colleges and universities in Massachusetts
List of colonial governors of Massachusetts
List of United States congressional districts in Massachusetts
List of counties in Massachusetts
List of county seats in Massachusetts
List of forts in Massachusetts
List of ghost towns in Massachusetts
List of governors of Massachusetts
List of high schools in Massachusetts
List of highway routes in Massachusetts
List of hospitals in Massachusetts
List of islands of Massachusetts
List of law enforcement agencies in Massachusetts
List of lieutenant governors of Massachusetts
List of museums in Massachusetts
List of National Historic Landmarks in Massachusetts
List of newspapers in Massachusetts
List of people from Massachusetts
List of radio stations in Massachusetts
List of railroads in Massachusetts
List of Registered Historic Places in Massachusetts
List of rivers of Massachusetts
List of school districts in Massachusetts
List of state forests in Massachusetts
List of state parks in Massachusetts
List of state prisons in Massachusetts
List of symbols of the Commonwealth of Massachusetts
List of telephone area codes in Massachusetts
List of television stations in Massachusetts
List of towns in Massachusetts
List of wired multiple-system broadband providers in Massachusetts (by municipality)
List of United States congressional delegations from Massachusetts
List of United States congressional districts in Massachusetts
List of United States representatives from Massachusetts
List of United States senators from Massachusetts
List of cheese created in Massachusetts

M
MA – United States Postal Service postal code for the Commonwealth of Massachusetts
Maps of Massachusetts
commons:Category:Maps of Massachusetts
Massachusetts  website
:Category:Massachusetts
commons:Category:Massachusetts
Massachusetts Archives
Massachusetts ballot measures, 2006
Massachusetts Consumers' Coalition
Massachusetts Corporation for Educational Telecommunications
Massachusetts Department of Conservation and Recreation
Massachusetts health care reform
Massachusetts Highway Department
Massachusetts Medal of Liberty
Massachusetts Port Authority
Massachusetts Promise Fellowship
Massachusetts State House
Massachusetts State Police
Massachusetts Department of Correction
Massachusetts Turnpike Authority
Monuments and memorials in Massachusetts
commons:Category:Monuments and memorials in Massachusetts
Mountains of Massachusetts
commons:Category:Mountains of Massachusetts
Museums in Massachusetts
:Category:Museums in Massachusetts
commons:Category:Museums in Massachusetts
Music of Massachusetts
commons:Category:Music of Massachusetts
:Category:Musical groups from Massachusetts
:Category:Musicians from Massachusetts

N
Natural arches of Massachusetts
commons:Category:Natural arches of Massachusetts
Natural history of Massachusetts
commons:Category:Natural history of Massachusetts
Nature centers in Massachusetts
commons:Category:Nature centers in Massachusetts
Natural Resource Protection Zoning
New England
News media in Massachusetts
Newspapers of Massachusetts

O
Outdoor sculptures in Massachusetts
commons:Category:Outdoor sculptures in Massachusetts

P
People from Massachusetts
:Category:People from Massachusetts
commons:Category:People from Massachusetts
:Category:People by city in Massachusetts
:Category:People by county in Massachusetts
:Category:People from Massachusetts by occupation
Plimouth, capital of Colony of New-Plimouth 1620-1686 and 1688–1691
Politics of Massachusetts
commons:Category:Politics of Massachusetts
Proposition 2½-the 1980s-era Massachusetts state property tax and excise tax for automobiles rate limitation to 2.5%
Protected areas of Massachusetts
commons:Category:Protected areas of Massachusetts

R
Radio stations in Massachusetts
Railroad museums in Massachusetts
commons:Category:Railroad museums in Massachusetts
Railroads in Massachusetts
Registered historic places in Massachusetts
commons:Category:Registered Historic Places in Massachusetts
Religion in Massachusetts
:Category:Religion in Massachusetts
commons:Category:Religion in Massachusetts
Rivers of Massachusetts
commons:Category:Rivers of Massachusetts
Rock formations in Massachusetts
commons:Category:Rock formations in Massachusetts
Roller coasters in Massachusetts
commons:Category:Roller coasters in Massachusetts

S
School districts of Massachusetts
Scouting in Massachusetts
Senate of the Commonwealth of Massachusetts
Settlements in Massachusetts
Cities in Massachusetts
Towns in Massachusetts
Villages in Massachusetts
Census Designated Places in Massachusetts
Other unincorporated communities in Massachusetts
List of ghost towns in Massachusetts
Ski areas and resorts in Massachusetts
commons:Category:Ski areas and resorts in Massachusetts
Sports in Massachusetts
:Category:Sports in Massachusetts
commons:Category:Sports in Massachusetts
:Category:Sports venues in Massachusetts
commons:Category:Sports venues in Massachusetts
State of Massachusetts - see: Commonwealth of Massachusetts
State of Massachusetts Bay, 1776–1780;
State parks of Massachusetts
commons:Category:State parks of Massachusetts
State Police of Massachusetts
State prisons of Massachusetts
Structures in Massachusetts
commons:Category:Buildings and structures in Massachusetts
Supreme Court of the Commonwealth of Massachusetts
Symbols of the Commonwealth of Massachusetts
:Category:Symbols of Massachusetts
commons:Category:Symbols of Massachusetts

T
Taxation in Massachusetts
:Category:Taxation in Massachusetts
Telecommunications in Massachusetts
commons:Category:Communications in Massachusetts
Telephone area codes in Massachusetts
Television shows set in Massachusetts
Television stations in Massachusetts
Theatres in Massachusetts
commons:Category:Theatres in Massachusetts
Tourism in Massachusetts  website
commons:Category:Tourism in Massachusetts
Towns in Massachusetts
commons:Category:Cities in Massachusetts
Transportation in Massachusetts
:Category:Transportation in Massachusetts
commons:Category:Transport in Massachusetts
Trauma centers in Massachusetts
Treasurer of the Commonwealth of Massachusetts

U
United States of America
States of the United States of America
United States census statistical areas of Massachusetts
United States congressional delegations from Massachusetts
United States congressional districts in Massachusetts
United States Court of Appeals for the First Circuit
United States District Court for the District of Massachusetts
United States representatives from Massachusetts
United States senators from Massachusetts
Universities and colleges in Massachusetts
commons:Category:Universities and colleges in Massachusetts
US-MA – ISO 3166-2:US region code for the Commonwealth of Massachusetts

W
Waterfalls of Massachusetts
commons:Category:Waterfalls of Massachusetts
Wikimedia
Wikimedia Commons:Category:Massachusetts
commons:Category:Maps of Massachusetts
Wikinews:Category:Massachusetts
Wikinews:Portal:Massachusetts
Wikipedia Category:Massachusetts
Wikipedia Portal:Massachusetts
Wikipedia:WikiProject Massachusetts
:Category:WikiProject Massachusetts articles
:Category:WikiProject Massachusetts members

Z
Zoos in Massachusetts
commons:Category:Zoos in Massachusetts

See also

Topic overview:
Massachusetts
Outline of Massachusetts

 
Massachusetts